Nordend (meaning north end in German) is a northern peak of the Monte Rosa Massif. Nordend is the fourth highest peak of the massif, after the Dufourspitze (4,634 m), the Dunantspitze (4,632 m) and the Grenzgipfel (4,618 m).

See also

List of Alpine four-thousanders

External links
 Nordend on Summitpost

Mountains of the Alps
Alpine four-thousanders
Mountains of Valais
Mountains of Piedmont
Pennine Alps
Italy–Switzerland border
International mountains of Europe
Monte Rosa
Mountains of Switzerland
Four-thousanders of Switzerland